Fast Life is an album by David Murray released on the DIW/Columbia label in 1991. It features four quartet performances by Murray with John Hicks, Ray Drummond, and Idris Muhammad and two tracks with saxophonist Branford Marsalis guesting.

Reception
The AllMusic review by Scott Yanow awarded the album 2 stars stating "This CD is a bit of a mixed bag. The great tenor David Murray is joined by pianist John Hicks, bassist Ray Drummond and drummer Idris Muhammad and is heard at his best on two relatively straight-ahead pieces, 'Luminous' and 'Off Season.' But Branford Marsalis guests on two other selections, and those are much more erratic, with rambling solos by the two tenors and a lot of aimless high energy. Wrapping up this set are a calypso and the lightweight 'Intuitively,' making the net results less than one might hope."

Track listing
 "Crucificado" (Dave Burrell) – 10:41 
 "Calle Estrella" (Wayne Francis) – 7:06 
 "Fast Life" – 12:04 
 "Luminous" (Elise Wood) – 10:31 
 "Intuitively" (Burrell, Monika Larsson) – 8:57 
 "Off Season" – 11:24 
All compositions by David Murray except as indicated
Recorded October 16 & 17, 1991, Power Station, NYC

Personnel
David Murray – tenor saxophone
John Hicks – piano
Ray Drummond – bass
Idris Muhammad – drums 
Branford Marsalis – tenor saxophone (tracks 1 & 3)

References 

1991 albums
David Murray (saxophonist) albums
DIW Records albums